The electoral division of Nelson is a constituency of the Tasmanian Legislative Council. The division includes many of the suburbs to the south of Hobart, including South Hobart, Sandy Bay, Taroona and Kingston. The division was created in 1999 when the electoral division of Queenborough was renamed in a review of electoral boundaries. The member from 1999 until his retirement in 2019 was independent Jim Wilkinson.

The most recent election was in May 2019, when independent candidate Meg Webb was elected.

Members

See also

 Tasmanian House of Assembly

References

External links
Parliament of Tasmania
Tasmanian Electoral Commission - Legislative Council

Nelson
Southern Tasmania